The 1890–91 Irish League was the first year of league football under the Irish Football Association.

League format
For this season, the league used a double Round-robin format, where teams played each other both home and away once.

Teams

League standings

Results

Top goalscorers

References
Northern Ireland - List of final tables (RSSSF)

External links
 Irish Premier League Website
 1890-91 Irish League Season at The Irish Football Club Project

1890-91
1890–91 domestic association football leagues
Lea